Shaun Ricker (born November 1, 1982) is an American professional wrestler. He is currently signed to WWE, where he performs on the SmackDown brand under the ring name LA Knight. Ricker is known for his time in Impact Wrestling as Eli Drake. Ricker has also worked extensively on the U.S. independent wrestling circuit, and has been signed by prominent promotions like Championship Wrestling from Hollywood and the National Wrestling Alliance (NWA).

Ricker began his wrestling career in 2003 on the independent circuit. He later joined the then-NWA-affiliated Championship Wrestling from Hollywood in 2010. After leaving CWFH in 2013, Ricker signed a developmental contract with WWE and performed on its then-developmental territory of NXT as "Slate Randall" before being released in 2014. Ricker then signed with Impact Wrestling (then named Total Nonstop Action Wrestling) in 2015. Ricker found great success in Impact/TNA, holding the Impact Global Championship, the TNA King of the Mountain Championship, and the Impact World Tag Team Championship (with Scott Steiner), once each. He also won Impact's Feast or Fired briefcase twice. 

After leaving Impact in 2019, Ricker signed with the recently rebooted NWA, where he held the NWA World Tag Team Championship (with James Storm) once. Ricker left the NWA in 2021 to sign with WWE. His character name changed to LA Knight, and he was again assigned to NXT (which was briefly a third major brand on par with two other WWE brands). Upon moving up to the SmackDown brand in 2022, Ricker was repackaged as a manager and adopted the character of a modeling agent named Max Dupri, before reverting back to his LA Knight persona, therefore resuming his in-ring performer role. 

Outside of wrestling, Ricker appeared as a cast member on the TNT reality series The Hero, hosted by Dwayne "The Rock" Johnson. He also appeared in an episode of Brooklyn Nine-Nine in 2015.

Professional wrestling career

Early career (2003–2010)
Ricker began working regularly for the Heartland Wrestling Association (HWA) in 2003 under the ring name Deuce. On November 9, 2004, Deuce would win the HWA Television Championship and lost it on January 4, 2005.

National Wrestling Alliance (2009–2012)

NWA Championship Wrestling from Hollywood (2010–2013) 
In December 2010, Ricker moved to work for the promotion NWA Championship Wrestling from Hollywood. He rejoined forces with Brian Cage, reforming The Natural Selection tag team and won the NWA Heritage Tag Team Championship on December 8, from The RockNES Monsters. After holding the titles for over 200 days and defending them against the likes of Young Hollywood and Rasche Brown and Slymm, the Natural Selection lost them to The Tribe due to the Brian Cage missing the event and becoming a two on one handicap match. Understandably upset after Cage's actions, Ricker would feud with him for several months, staying even on victories until late 2012 when Ricker defeated Cage.

After this win, Ricker earned a shot at Adam Pearce's NWA Worlds Heavyweight Championship which took place on December 4 and Ricker lost. Throughout 2012, Ricker would aim high, trying to earn himself a championship shot which included numerous battle royals and even made it to the finals of the Percy Pringle III Cup where the winner would earn a shot at any championship, any time, any place. Rickers feud with Cage would resurface in late 2012 and culminated in a casket match which Ricker won. With this massive win Ricker finally found singles success in by winning the 30-Man Red Carpet Rumble for the CWFH Heritage Heavyweight Championship in homage to his late friend and manager Percy Pringle on May 5, 2013 and successfully defended it that same night against Ryan Taylor.

Ricker would lose the championship to Scorpio Sky in a loser leaves Hollywood match later that night, this match was scheduled to air on June 2, on tape delay, but was never aired due to the controversial finish. After the cameras went off Ricker got on the mic and thanked all of the fans for coming out. He said this would be the last time we would see him in a ring for Championship Wrestling from Hollywood. All of the wrestlers came out from the back and gave Ricker a standing ovation. However, he made one more final appearance defeating Scorpio Sky's fellow Experience members Big Duke and Xtian Cole, making it his final television appearance.

WWE (2013–2014)
Ricker made his first WWE appearance in 2008 in a dark match on ECW, teaming with Gene Snitsky in a losing effort against Cryme Tyme. He also appeared in 2011 during a segment between CM Punk and Kevin Nash in the role of a security guard (the infamous text message promo).

In May 2013, the Wrestling Observer Newsletter reported that Ricker, along with several other independent wrestlers, was undergoing the necessary medical testing required to be signed to WWE. He reported to the WWE Performance Center. Ricker, using the new ring name Slate Randall, defeated Yoshi Tatsu in a dark match during the October 2013 television tapings of NXT. Following that win, he only competed as an enhancement talent for NXT, losing to names such as Mason Ryan, Baron Corbin, and Mojo Rawley. His final match was on May 2, 2014 at an NXT Live event. On August 1, 2014, he was released from his WWE contract. Ricker would later say his release was due to not getting along with then-NXT head trainer Bill Demott (whom WWE would later fire after allegations of Demott's abusive behaviors toward several wrestlers became widely reported by wrestling news sites).

Return to the independent circuit (2014–2019)
After his release from WWE, Ricker returned to wrestling on the independent circuit. On September 5, at Full Impact Pro's Fallout, he (along with Mason Ryan and Michael Tarver) participated in a trios tournament, but they were defeated by the Full Impact Puerto Ricans (Lince Dorado, Jay Cruz, and Jay Rios) in the semifinals. On November 21, 2014, Ricker defeated Kenny King at FSW Luck of the Draw. He made his return to Championship Wrestling from Hollywood for two appearances before he signed to Impact Wrestling in early 2015.

In his first match following the Impact Wrestling controversy, Drake lost a fatal four way at Maverick Pro Wrestling's May 11, 2019 event. On August 17, 2019, Drake made his debut for World Wrestling Council in Puerto Rico at WWC Aniversario wrestling Carlito Colon.

Total Nonstop Action Wrestling / Impact Wrestling (2015–2019)

The Rising and early feuds (2015–2016)

On February 16, 2015, Ricker participated in TNA One Night Only's TNA Gut Check tournament, defeating Crazzy Steve to qualify for the final match of the night, which was a five-way elimination match won by Tevita Fifita. On March 14, 2015, Ricker, under the name Eli Drake, participated in the Impact Wrestling tapings, joining Drew Galloway and Micah to form The Rising and defeating The Beat Down Clan. On the July 1 episode of Impact Wrestling, The Beat Down Clan defeated The Rising in a 4-on-3 handicap match, forcing The Rising to dissolve. On the July 15 episode of Impact Wrestling, Drake turned heel when he cost Galloway a match against the TNA World Heavyweight Champion Ethan Carter III. At No Surrender on August 5, Drake defeated Galloway. On the August 19 episode of Impact Wrestling, Drake faced Galloway in a No Disqualification Match, which he lost. 

On October 4, 2015, at Bound for Glory, Drake competed in a twelve-man Bound For Gold Gauntlet match which was won by Tyrus. Drake participated in the TNA World Title Series as a member of group Future 4, along with Jessie Godderz, Micah and Crimson advancing the round of 16 along with Godderz where he lost in the round of 16 to Mahabali Shera, thus failing to advance to the quarterfinals and being eliminated from the tournament. On January 5, 2016, the first live edition of Impact Wrestling on Pop, Drake and Jessie Godderz started feuding with Kurt Angle and Drew Galloway, leading to a match at TNA One Night Only Live, which was won by The Wolves.

On January 26, 2016, Drake won the Feast or Fired match and the briefcase that contained a title shot for the future TNA King Of The Mountain Championship. On the February 9 episode of Impact Wrestling, Drake was attacked by Grado who had been fired after his Feast or Fired briefcase contained the pink slip. Later that night Drake interrupted him backstage and told him "he better shut up about whatever he thinks he knows" and then attacked Grado again and had him escorted out of the building through the tunnel. Drake feuded with Grado once again who was masked as Odarg the Great feuding him backstage with Jessie Godderz and telling him he was going to be facing against him. This led the match on the February 16 episode of Impact Wrestling, which he lost, and led to the rematch at TNA Lockdown special episode of Impact Wrestling in the Six Sides of Steel match, in which he's unsuccessful due to interference from the returning Mahabali Shera who went on to team with Odarg the Great and pulling his mask off from his face. On the March 15 live edition of Impact Wrestling he received another rematch against Grado in a Ladder match, the career of Grado on the line, however he was defeated by Grado to end the feud.

Fact of Life and Namer of Dummies (2016–2017)

On the May 31 episode of Impact on Pop, Drake cashed in his Feast or Fired briefcase for his shot at the TNA King of the Mountain Championship, defeating Bram who was just viciously attacked by Lashley, winning his first title in TNA. On June 12 at Slammiversary, Drake defeated Bram to retain the championship. On the June 28 episode of Impact Wrestling, Drake hosted a Fact of Life segment, inviting James Storm as his guest, where he proceeded to insult him; Storm eventually hit Drake with the Last Call, igniting a feud between the two. The next week on the July 5 episode of Impact Wrestling, Drake defended the King of the Mountain Championship against Storm, but intentionally disqualified himself to save the title. However, on the August 4 episode of Impact Wrestling, Drake lost the King of the Mountain Championship to James Storm. Drake entered in the Impact Grand Championship tournament on the September 8 episode of Impact Wrestling, defeating Jessie Godderz in the first round. However, he was defeated by Aron Rex on the September 22 episode of Impact Wrestling in the semi final. At Bound for Glory Drake won the Bound for Gold. On the October 6 episode of Impact Wrestling, Drake started a feud against Ethan Carter III, after his Fact of Life segment. On the October 27 episode of Impact Wrestling, Eli Drake and Aron Rex defeated Ethan Carter III and Jessie Godderz in a tag-team match. On the November 10 episode of Impact Wrestling, Drake cashed in his Bound for Gold opportunity but failed to win the TNA World Heavyweight Championship against Eddie Edwards. On the November 24 episode of Impact Wrestling, Drake faced EC3 in a title shot vs. voice match where if Ethan lost, he would lose his Heavyweight title shot and if Drake lost, he would not be able to talk for the rest of 2016. EC3 won the match by submission.

On the January 5 episode of Impact Wrestling, Eli Drake had a confrontation against The Broken Hardys during his returning Fact of Life segment, which led to a tag team match for their TNA World Tag Team Championship at One Night Only: Live!, teaming with Tyrus, which never happened. However, his association with Tyrus continued, Tyrus helping him to take the red case during the Race for the Case on the January 19 episode of Impact Wrestling. On the February 2 episode of Impact Wrestling, Drake cashed in his Race for the Case briefcase for a match against Ethan Carter III, but was defeated. After the match, he and Tyrus attacked EC3, but they were assaulted by the Death Crew Council. On the February 9 episode of Impact Wrestling, Eli Drake and Tyrus were defeated by The Death Crew Council in a handicap match. During the match, Drake abandoned Tyrus. A match was scheduled between Drake and Tyrus two weeks later, which ended in a victory of Tyrus by disqualification. After the match, Drake proposed more money to Tyrus for keeping him as a bodyguard, which Tyrus accepted. On the March 16 episode of Impact Wrestling, Drake and Tyrus were defeated by Garza Jr. and Laredo Kid. During the match, Drake unintentionally hit Tyrus, causing the loss. On the April 13 episode of Impact Wrestling, Drake and Tyrus, alongside Bram and Lashley as Team Josh Mathews were defeated by Team Jeremy Borash (Alberto El Patron, Chris Adonis, Magnus and Matt Morgan).

On the May 4 episode of Impact Wrestling, Drake was defeated by Alberto El Patron and failed to be the number one contender for the GFW Global Championship. The following week, with the help of Tyrus and Chris Adonis, he attacked Impact Grand champion Moose after his match against Marshe Rockett. On the June 1 episode of Impact Wrestling, Drake was defeated by Moose and failed to win the Impact Grand Championship. At Slammiversary, Drake and Chris Adonis were defeated by Moose and DeAngelo Williams.

Impact Global Champion (2017–2018)

On the August 24 episode of Impact!, Drake won a 20-man gauntlet match, from the second entrant position, to win the vacant GFW Global Championship for the first time. This was Drake's first world title reign from a major wrestling promotion in his career. The title would be then renamed to the Impact Global Championship. Drake would defend the title against Matt Sydal on Impact and against Cody Hall in Japan for Pro Wrestling Noah. He would soon begin feuding with Johnny Impact for the title as Drake retained the title against Impact at Victory Road after repeated interference from Adonis and a low blow. This would lead to a rematch between Drake and Impact for the title at Bound for Glory, where Drake retained again after the returning Alberto El Patron hit Impact with a steel chair. Drake would retain the title against Impact and El Patron in a Six Sides of Steel match at Genesis. He lost the title on the February 1 episode of Impact Wrestling against the returning Austin Aries,  ending his reign at 146 days. Drake got his rematch on the February 15 episode of Impact Wrestling, but failed to regain the title.

On the March 15 episode of Impact Wrestling Drake won a briefcase during the Feast or Fired, which contained an opportunity for the Impact World Tag Team Championship match, which he didn't want as he no longer had a tag team partner. Then, he challenged Moose for his World Championship briefcase on the April 5 episode of Impact Wrestling, which he won, thanks to an intervention of Ohio Versus Everything. At Redemption, Drake and his tag team partner Scott Steiner defeated The Latin American Xchange to become the new Impact World Tag Team Champions. On the April 26 episode of Impact!, Drake and Steiner defeated LAX in a rematch to retain the Tag Team Championship. Two weeks later, Drake cashed in his World Championship briefcase against Pentagón Jr., but failed to win the title. On the May 17 episode of Impact, Drake and Steiner lost the titles against D&E (DJZ and Andrew Everett). After some tensions between the two partners, a match was scheduled at Under Pressure, which Drake won after a chair shot.

On the June 7 episode of Impact Wrestling, during his Fact of Life segment, Drake ranked Moose number one in his top five dummies in Impact. Moose confronted Drake later and challenged him for a match to determine the number one contender to the Impact World Championship at Slammiversary XVI. Drake accepted the challenge and attacked Moose. The following week at House of Hardcore, Drake was defeated by Moose. On June 25, Eli Drake signed a new contract with Impact Wrestling. On the July 12 episode of Impact Wrestling, Drake flirted with Grado's girlfriend, Katarina, during a backstage segment. This led to a match between Drake and Grado later that night, which was won by Drake. After the match, he tried again to flirt with Katarina, but Drake was stopped by Joe Hendry. The following week, Drake was defeated by Hendry. On the August 2 episode of Impact Wrestling, Drake aligned himself with the Cult of Lee (Trevor Lee and Caleb Konley) and defeated Hendry and Grado in a tag-team match. Two weeks later, Drake defeated Hendry in a singles match. Between June and October, Drake issued various open challenges. On the October 11 episode of Impact Wrestling, Drake issued an open challenge at Bound for Glory. At the event, Drake defeated James Ellsworth. After the match, Drake asked for a new challenger, a "Hall of Fame material" which resulted in Abyss, newest Impact Wrestling Hall of Fame member, showing up and hitting him with a Chokeslam through a table.

Feuding with hardcore wrestlers and departure (2018–2019) 
On the October 18 episode of Impact Wrestling, Drake started a storyline where he sued Impact Wrestling management for "unsafe working environment" after the attack of Abyss at Bound for Glory. The following week, Drake bullied Impact Wrestling commentator Don Callis and took his place for the rest of the show. On the November 8 episode of Impact Wrestling, Drake betrayed his lawyer Joseph Park after a low-blow. Then the following week, Drake criticized the "hardcore wrestling", saying that he is the "Last of a Dying Breed", before being confronted by Tommy Dreamer. Two weeks later, Drake wrestled against Dreamer but walked away from the match, losing via count-out. However, the match was restarted by Impact Wrestling management, and become a No Disqualification match, which Drake won. On the January 3, 2019, episode of Impact Wrestling, Drake was confronted and attacked by Tommy Dreamer and Raven. At Impact Wrestling Homecoming, Drake defeated Abyss in a Monster's Ball match.

On the January 11 episode, Eli confronted Eddie Edwards, talking down about his hardcore style. However, Eli and Edwards defeated The Rascalz in a tag-team match on the February 1 episode of Impact Wrestling after Eli hit his opponent with Kenny, Eddie's kendo stick. On the February 22 episode, Edwards defeated Eli with a roll-up. After the match, Eli says that he was proud of Edwards, because he defeated him with a "wrestling move". Two weeks later, Eli saved Edwards from the Desi Hit Squad. Then, they formed a tag-team, and defeated Fallah Bahh and KM, when Eddie allowed Drake to use Kenny for hitting KM and stealing the victory. On the April 5 episode of Impact Wrestling, Eli and Edwards defeated LAX with the help of the Lucha Bros. Two weeks later, Eli and Edwards were defeated by the Lucha Bros and failed to win the Impact World Tag Team Championship.

During this time, a match was booked between Drake and Tessa Blanchard at United We Stand. However, Drake didn't want to wrestle a competitive match against a woman, criticizing intergender wrestling. After those comments, as well as comments disparaging Impact's booking of him, he was fired via e-mail on April 7. Following that, Impact tried to lock Drake into a no-complete clause due to breach of contract. However, on June 4, Drake released a statement speaking positively about Impact, and announced he was now a free agent.

National Wrestling Alliance (2019–2021)
On June 28, 2019, Drake appeared at the Ring of Honor event Best in the World, being revealed as the mystery partner of Nick Aldis. This revealed him as the newest person to sign an exclusive deal with the National Wrestling Alliance (NWA). On January 24 at the NWA Hard Times event, Drake and his tag team partner James Storm won the NWA Tag Team Championship. Drake and Storm would drop the titles to Aron Stevens and JR Kratos at UWN Primetime Live. On February 14, 2021, it was announced that Ricker had been quietly released from the NWA in late 2020 after only signing a new deal with the company a few months beforehand.

Return to WWE

NXT (2021–2022) 
On February 14, 2021, it was reported that Ricker had re-signed with WWE. At NXT TakeOver: Vengeance Day, he debuted as a heel, where it was revealed his new ring name would be LA Knight. On the first night of TakeOver: Stand & Deliver on April 7, Knight participated in a Gauntlet Eliminator for a future NXT North American Championship match, but lost. Knight then aligned himself with Ted DiBiase, and at TakeOver: In Your House on June 13, he defeated Cameron Grimes in a ladder match to win the re-introduced Million Dollar Championship. Knight later turned on DiBiase, attacking him during the title ceremony, before being driven off by Grimes. At The Great American Bash on July 6, Knight defeated Grimes and as per the stipulation of the rematch, Grimes became Knight's personal butler. On the August 10 episode of NXT, Knight agreed to defend the championship against Grimes at NXT TakeOver 36 under the condition that if Knight won, DiBiase would replace Grimes as Knight's personal butler. At the event on August 22, Knight lost the title to Grimes following interference from DiBiase, ending his reign at 70 days. 

In October, Knight began a feud with Grayson Waller. On the November 23 episode of NXT, a double turn took place; Waller turned heel by berating the fans, and Knight turned face by displaying fighting spirit attitude, and before his match with Joe Gacy, Knight was attacked by Waller. At WarGames on December 5, Knight teamed with Johnny Gargano, Pete Dunne, and Tommaso Ciampa as Team Black & Gold, where they lost to Team 2.0 (Bron Breakker, Carmelo Hayes, Grayson Waller, and Tony D'Angelo) in a WarGames match. In March, Knight started a brief feud with Gunther when the latter took offense at Knight getting an NXT Championship match by calling out Dolph Ziggler. The next week, Knight confronted Gunther after his match with Duke Hudson and challenged him to a match at NXT Stand & Deliver on April 2, which he lost. This turned out to be his final NXT appearance.

Main roster (2022–present) 
Knight made his first main roster appearance on the January 24, 2022 episode of Raw, participating in a backstage segment with The Dirty Dawgs (Dolph Ziggler and Robert Roode). In a dark segment before the April 15 episode of SmackDown, Knight appeared as a villainous manager by announcing his new stable, "Knight Model Management", and became the manager of Mace and Mansoor. The angle went to television on the May 20 episode of SmackDown, when he made his televised debut on the brand under the ring name Max Dupri. He would announce Mace and Mansoor, under the tweaked names "ma.çé" and "mån.sôör", as Maximum Male Models. He would then be joined by his storyline sister, Maxxine Dupri (formerly known as Sofia Cromwell from NXT). Dupri ended his relationship with Maximum Male Models on the September 30 episode of SmackDown. The following week, he beat down Mace and Mansoor and reverted to his LA Knight persona. After a brief feud with Ricochet, Knight became involved in a feud with Bray Wyatt which culminated in a Mountain Dew Pitch Black match at the Royal Rumble which he lost.

Other media
In 2013, Ricker appeared on the TNT reality television show The Hero, which was hosted by Dwayne "The Rock" Johnson.

In 2015, Ricker appeared in season 2/episode 17 of the U.S. sitcom Brooklyn Nine-Nine. In the episode (entitled "Boyle-Linetti Wedding"), Ricker plays the nonspeaking role of Mario, a male bodybuilder who's getting married. Detective Terry Jeffords (Terry Crews) plays the minister.

In 2021, Ricker appeared in a CarShield ad as “The Overcharger”: a heel wrestler dressed like an automotive repair technician, defiantly bragging about how no one can stop him from unfairly charging (used-vehicle-owning) customers for repair work. He is instantly struck down by Ric Flair (the ad campaign's star/pitchman).

As LA Knight, he appeared in WWE 2K22 as downloadable content and Ricker provides the voice for "Paragon Jay Pierce" in the game's MyRise mode.

Also in late 2019, LA Knight can be seen for a brief segment on Netflix's "Magic For Humans", season 2 episode "Fake".

Championships and accomplishments

 Championship Wrestling From Hollywood
 CWFH Heritage Heavyweight Championship (1 time)
 NWA Heritage Tag Team Championship (2 times) – with Brian Cage
 Red Carpet Rumble (2013)
 DDT Pro-Wrestling
 Ironman Heavymetalweight Championship (1 time)
 Future Stars of Wrestling
 FSW Heavyweight Championship (2 time) 
 Empire Wrestling Federation
 EWF Heavyweight Championship (1 time)
 Great Goliath Battle Royal (2011) – with Josh Dunbar
 Heartland Wrestling Association
 HWA Television Championship (1 time)
 Mach One Wrestling
 M1W Tag Team Championship (1 time) – with Brian Cage
 M1W Tag Team Championship Tournament (2010) – with Brian Cage
National Wrestling Alliance
NWA World Tag Team Championship (1 time) – with James Storm
Pro Wrestling Illustrated
 Ranked No. 32 of the top 500 singles wrestlers in the PWI 500 in 2018
Pro Wrestling Revolution
 PWR Heavyweight Championship (1 time)
Total Nonstop Action Wrestling / Impact Wrestling
Impact World Championship (1 time)1
Impact World Tag Team Championship (1 time) – with Scott Steiner
TNA King of the Mountain Championship (1 time)
Gauntlet for the Gold (2016, 2017 – Heavyweight)
Race for the Case (2017 – Red Case)
Feast or Fired (2016 – King of the Mountain Championship contract)
Feast or Fired (2018 – World Tag Team Championship contract)
Ultimate Championship Wrestling
UCW Heavyweight Championship (1 time)
 Wrestling Observer Newsletter
 Worst Gimmick (2022) as part of Maximum Male Models
WWE
Million Dollar Championship (1 time)

References

External links

 
 
 
 

1982 births
21st-century professional wrestlers
American male professional wrestlers
Living people
Million Dollar Champions
People from Hagerstown, Maryland
Professional wrestlers from Maryland
Sportspeople from Maryland
TNA World Heavyweight/Impact World Champions
TNA Legends/Global/Television/King of the Mountain Champions
TNA/Impact World Tag Team Champions
TNA Gut Check contestants
Ironman Heavymetalweight Champions
NWA World Tag Team Champions